This is a list of infantry weapons of World War I (1914-1918).

Austro-Hungarian Empire

Edged weapons

M1858/61 Kavalleriesäbel
M1862 Infanteriesäbel
M1873 Artilleriesäbel
M1904 Kavalleriesäbel
M1915 Pioneer sword

Flare guns

Hebel M1894

Sidearms

Browning FN M1900
Dreyse M1907
Frommer M1912 Stop
Gasser M1870, M1870/84 and M1873
Gasser-Kropatschek M1876
Mannlicher M1901
Mauser C96
Rast & Gasser M1898
Roth–Sauer M1900
Roth–Steyr M1907
Steyr M1912
Steyr-Pieper M1908
Steyr-Pieper M1909
Werder M1869

Submachine guns

Steyr M1912 doppel machinen pistole (Double barrel version)
Steyr M1912/P16 machinen pistole (Single barrel version)

Rifles

GRC Gewehr 88/05
Kropatschek M1886 and M1893
Mannlicher M1886/88
Mannlicher M1888 and M1888/90
Mannlicher M1890 Carbine
Mannlicher M1893
Mannlicher M1895
Mannlicher–Schönauer M1903/14
Mauser Gewehr 98
Mauser M1903
Mondragón M1908
Steyr-Mauser M1912
Wänzl M1867
Werndl-Holub M1867

Machine guns

DWM MG 08
MG 08/15
Madsen M1902
Schwarzlose M1907 and M1907/12
Schwarzlose M1916 and M1916A
Škoda M1893 and M1902
Škoda M1909 and M1913

Grenades

M1915, M1916 and M1917 Stielhandgranate
M1917 Eierhandgranate
Rohr Handgranate

Flamethrowers

Flammenwerfer M1916
Kleinflammenwerfer M1911

Mortars

7.5cm M1917 Minenwerfer
9cm M1914 and M1914/16 Minenwerfer
9cm M1917 Minenwerfer
12cm M1915 Minenwerfer
12cm M1916 Luftminenwerfer
Ehrhardt 10.5cm M1915 Luftminenwerfer
Esslingen 15cm M1915 Luftminenwerfer
Granatenwerfer 16
Lanz 9.15cm M1914 leicht Minenwerfer
Roka-Halasz 8cm M1915 Luftminenwerfer
Schnellwerfer (Grenade mortar)
Škoda 14cm M1915 and M1916 Minenwerfer

Support guns

Škoda 3.7cm M1915 Infanteriegeschutz

Kingdom of Belgium

Sidearms

Browning FN M1900
Browning FN M1903
Browning FN M1910
Colt M1903 Pocket Hammerless
Nagant M1895
Ruby M1914

Shotguns

Browning Auto-5 (Used by Garde Civique)

Rifles

Gewehr M1898 
Berthier M1907
Comblain M1882, M1883 and M1888
Gras M1874
Lebel M1886/93
Mauser M1889
Mauser M1893

Machine guns

Chauchat M1915
Colt–Browning M1895/14
Hotchkiss M1909
Hotchkiss M1914
Lewis M1914
Maxim M1911

Grenades

F1 M1915, M1916 and M1917
No.5, No.23 and No.36 (Also known as "Mills")
Viven-Bessières M1916 rifle grenade

Mortars

Saint Chamond 142mm M1915 Delattre
Schneider 75mm M1915
Van Deuren 70mm M1915

British Empire

Edged weapons

Kukri machete (Used by Gurkha regiments)
M1907 bayonet
Pattern P1897 officer's sword
Pistol bayonet

Flare guns

Webley & Scott Mark III

Sidearms

Colt M1903 Pocket Hammerless
Colt M1909 New Service 
Colt M1911 
Enfield Mk I and Mk II
Lancaster M1860
Mauser C96 
Smith & Wesson M1899
Smith & Wesson M1917
Smith & Wesson No.3
Smith & Wesson Triple Lock
Webley–Fosbery Automatic (Private purchase by officers only)
Webley M1872 British Bull Dog
Webley Mk IV, Mk V and Mk VI
Webley Self-Loading Mk I

Automatic Rifles
Huot Automatic Rifle
(Used Mostly by the Dominion Of Canada)

Rifles

Arisaka Type 30 (Royal Navy and home defence only)
Arisaka Type 38
Elephant gun (Ad hoc use against sniper armour)
Enfield Pattern P1914
Farquhar–Hill Pattern P1918 (Troop trials only)
Farquharson M1872
Lee–Enfield Magazine Mk I
Lee–Enfield Short Magazine Mk I, Mk II and Mk III
Lee–Metford Mk I and Mk II
Lee–Speed No.1 and No.2
Mauser–Verqueiro M1904 (Used by South African units)
Marlin M1894
Martini–Enfield Mk I and Mk II
Martini–Henry Mk IV
Remington M1901 Rolling Block
Remington Model 14-1/2
Ross Mark III (Canadian service)
Snider–Enfield Mk III
Winchester M1886 (Royal Flying Corps)
Winchester M1892 (Royal Navy)
Winchester M1894 (Royal Navy shipboard use)
Winchester M1895
Winchester M1907 (120 rifles for Royal Flying Corps)
Winchester M1910

Machine guns

Colt–Browning M1895/14 (Canadian service)
Browning M1917
Hotchkiss Mk I
Lewis Mk I
Madsen machine gun (India)
Maxim M1884
Vickers machine gun

Grenades

No.1 grenade
No.2 grenade (Also known as "Hales")
No.3 rifle grenade (Also known as "Hales")
No.5, No.23 and No.36 grenade (Also known as "Mills")
No.6 and No.7 grenade
No.8 and No.9 double cylinder grenade (Also known as "Jam tin")
No.15 and No.16 grenade (Also known as "Ball")
No.17 rifle grenade
No.20 rifle grenade
No.22 rifle grenade
No.24 rifle grenade
No.35 rifle grenade
No.44 rifle grenade

Obstacle clearing explosive charges

McClintock Bangalore torpedo

Flamethrowers

Hay portable flamethrower
Morriss portable flamethrower

Mortars

2-inch mortar
3.7-inch mortar
4-inch mortar
Garland trench mortar
Livens Projector
Newton 6-inch mortar 
Stokes mortar
Vickers 1.57-inch mortar

Projectile weapons

Leach Trench Catapult
Sauterelle
West Spring Gun

Anti-aircraft weapons

Maxim QF 1-pounder pom-pom
QF 2-pounder naval AA gun (Sixteen guns)
QF 12-pounder 12 cwt AA gun
QF 13-pounder Mk IV AA gun (Six guns)
QF 13-pounder 9 cwt AA gun
QF 13-pounder 6 cwt AA gun

Kingdom of Bulgaria

Sidearms

Beholla M1915
Browning FN M1903
Frommer M1912 Stop
Luger P08
Mauser C96
Nagant M1895
Smith & Wesson No.3

Rifles

Berdan M1870
Gras M1874
Krnka M1867
Mannlicher M1886/88
Mannlicher M1888 and M1888/90
Mannlicher M1890
Mannlicher M1895
Mauser Gewehr 71
Mosin–Nagant M1891
Peabody–Martini–Henry M1874

Machine guns

DWM MG 08
Madsen M1902
Maxim M1904 and M1907
Saint Étienne M1907
Schmeisser-Dreyse MG 12
Schwarzlose M1907/12

Flamethrowers

Kleinflammenwerfer M1911

Infantry mortar
Granatenwerfer 16

French Third Republic

Edged weapons

Clou Français (Nail knife)
Lebel M1886/14 poignard baïonnette (Dagger bayonet)
M1882 le sabre d'officier d'infanterie (Sword)
M1916 couteau poignard (Knife dagger, also known as Le Vengeur)

Sidearms

Browning FN M1900
Chamelot–Delvigne M1873 and M1874
Colt M1892
Colt M1911
Ruby M1914
Saint Étienne M1892
Savage M1907
Smith & Wesson M1899
Star M1914

Submachine guns
Ribeyrolles 1918 automatic carbine

Rifles

Berthier M1890, M1892, M1892/16, M1902, M1907, M1907/15 and M1916
Chassepot M1866/74 
Gras M1874 and M1874/14
Kropatschek M1884 and M1885 
Lebel M1886/93 
Lee–Metford Mk I and Mk II
Meunier M1916
Remington M1867 and M1914 Rolling Block
Remington Model 8
Remington–Lee M1887
RSC M1917 and M1918
Winchester M1894
Winchester M1907
Winchester M1907/17
Winchester M1910

Machine guns

Chauchat M1915
Colt–Browning M1895/14
Darne M1916
Hotchkiss M1909
Hotchkiss M1914
Puteaux M1905
Saint Étienne M1907 and M1907/16

Grenades

Bezossi M1915
F1 M1915, M1916 and M1917
OF1 M1915 grenade
P1 M1915 grenade
Suffocante M1914 and M1916 gas grenade
M1847 ball grenade
M1914 ball grenade
M1918 anti-tank grenade
Pig iron lighting grenade
Bertrand M1915 and M1916 gas grenade
Foug M1916 grenade
IIIrd army grenade
DR M1916 rifle grenade
Feuillette rifle grenade
Viven-Bessières M1916 rifle grenade

Obstacle clearing explosive charges

Barbed wire destruction rod grenade

Flamethrowers

P3 and P4 portable flamethrower
Schilt portable flamethrower

Mortars

Aasen 88.9mm M1915
Saint Étienne 58mm T No.1
Saint Étienne 58mm T No.2
Schneider 75mm M1915
Van Deuren 70mm M1915

Projectile weapons

Sauterelle

Support guns

Puteaux 37mm M1916

German Empire

Edged weapons

M1889 Infanteriesäbel (Sword)
Seitengewehr 84/98 III (Bayonet)
Seitengewehr 98/05 (Bayonet)

Flare guns

Hebel M1894

Sidearms

Bayard M1908
Beholla M1915
Bergmann–Bayard M1910
Dreyse M1907
Frommer M1912 Stop
Langenhan M1914 Selbstlader
Luger P04 and P08
Mauser C96
Mauser C78 and C86 Zig-Zag
Mauser M1910 and M1914
Reichsrevolver M1879 and M1883
Schwarzlose M1908
Steyr M1912

Submachine guns

Bergmann MP 18-I

Rifles

Elefantengewehr
GRC Gewehr 88/05, Gewehr 88/14, Gewehr 91 and Karabiner 88
Mauser Gewehr 71 and 71/84
Mauser Gewehr 98
Mauser Karabiner 98A
Mauser M1887
Mauser M1915 and M1916 Selbstlader
Mondragón M1908
Werder M1869

Machine guns

Bergmann MG 15 (Water cooled version)
Bergmann MG 15nA (Air cooled version)
DWM MG 99, MG 01, MG 08, MG 08/15, MG 08/18 and MG 09
DWM Parabellum MG 14 and MG 14/17
Gast M1917
Madsen M1902
Schmeisser-Dreyse MG 12, MG 15 and MG 18

Grenades

M1913 Karabingranate
M1914 Karabingranate
M1917 Karabingranate
M1913 Kugelhandgranate
M1915 Kugelhandgranate NA
M1915 Diskushandgranate (Offensive version and defensive version)
M1915, M1916 and M1917 Stielhandgranate
M1917 Eierhandgranate

Anti-tank mines

Flachmine 17

Flamethrowers

Flammenwerfer M1916
Kleinflammenwerfer M1911
Wechselapparat Flammenwerfer M1917

Mortars

Granatenwerfer 16
Lanz 9.15cm M1914 leicht Minenwerfer
Rheinmetall 7.58cm M1914 leicht Minenwerfer AA and NA
Rheinmetall 17cm M1913 mittler Minenwerfer

Support guns

Krupp 7.62cm L/16.5 Infanteriegeschütz
Krupp 7.7cm L/20 Infanteriegeschütz
Krupp 7.7cm L/27 Infanteriegeschütz

Anti-tank weapons

Becker 2cm M2 Tankabwehrgewehr
DWM 1.32cm MG 18 Tank und Flieger
Mauser 1.3cm M1918 Tankgewehr
Rheinmetall 3.7cm M1918 Tankabwehrkanone

Anti-aircraft weapons

Becker 2cm M2 Flugzeugabwehrgewehr
DWM 1.32cm MG 18 Tank und Flieger
Krupp 3.7cm L/14.5 Sockelflugzeugabwehrkanone
Krupp 7.62cm L/30 Flugzeugabwehrkanone
Krupp 7.7cm L/27 Flugzeugabwehrkanone
Krupp 7.7cm L/35 Flugzeugabwehrkanone

Kingdom of Greece

Edged weapons

Bayonet
Improvised knife

Sidearms

Bergmann-Bayard M1903 and M1908
Browning FN M1900
Browning FN M1903
Chamelot-Delvigne M1873, M1874 and M1884
Colt M1907 Army Special
Mannlicher M1901
Nagant M1895
Ruby M1914

Rifles

Berthier M1892, M1892/16, M1907/15 and M1916
Gras M1874 and M1874/14
Lebel M1886/93 
Mannlicher M1895
Mannlicher-Schönauer M1903 and M1903/14

Machine guns

Chauchat M1915
Colt-Browning M1895/14
Hotchkiss M1914
Saint Étienne M1907/16
Schwarzlose M1907/12

Grenades

F1 M1915, M1916 and M1917
Improvised bombs and grenades

Mortars

Aasen 88.9mm M1915 
Stokes mortar

Kingdom of Italy

Edged weapons

M1891 sciabola baionetta (Sword bayonet)

Sidearms

Beretta M1915
Bodeo M1889
Brixia M1913
Chamelot–Delvigne M1873 and M1874
Glisenti M1910
Mauser C96
Ruby M1914
Smith & Wesson No.3

Submachine guns
OVP 1918
Beretta M1918
Villar-Perosa M1915

Rifles

Berthier M1892, M1892/16, M1907/15 and M1916
Carcano M1891
Lebel M1886/93
Vetterli M1870, M1870/87 and M1870/87/15

Machine guns

Chauchat M1915 
Colt–Browning M1895/14
Fiat–Revelli M1914
Gardner M1886
Hotchkiss M1914
Lewis Mk I
Maxim M1906 and M1911
Nordenfelt M1884
Perino M1908
Saint Étienne M1907
Vickers Mk I

Grenades

Bezossi M1915
Lenticolare M1914

Flamethrowers

Schilt portable flamethrower

Mortars

Stokes mortar
Saint Étienne 58mm T No.2

Empire of Japan

Edged weapons

Guntō sword
Type 30 bayonet

Sidearms

Hino–Komuro M1908
Meiji Type 26
Nambu Type B
Smith & Wesson No.3

Rifles

Arisaka Type 30
Arisaka Type 35
Arisaka Type 38
Arisaka Type 44 Carbine
Murata Type 13, Type 18 and Type 22
Snider-Enfield

Machine guns

Hotchkiss M1900
Nambu Type 3

Kingdom of MontenegroSidearmsGasser M1870/74 and M1880
Mannlicher M1901
Rast & Gasser M1898
Smith & Wesson M1899
Smith & Wesson No.3RiflesBerdan M1870
Gras M1874
Mosin–Nagant M1891
Wänzl M1867
Werndl-Holub M1867Machine gunsDWM MG 08
Maxim M1906 and M1912
Nordenfelt multiple barrel gun

Ottoman EmpireEdged weaponslance (only used by cavalry regiments)
Trench club
Sword (only used by cavalry regiment or officer)
khanjar
Yatagan
M1890 bayonetsSidearmsBeholla M1915
British Bull Dog revolver
Browning FN M1903
Frommer M1912 Stop
Luger P08
Mauser C96
Smith & Wesson No.3RiflesMauser 1887
Berdan rifle
GRC Gewehr 88/05
Martini–Henry Mk I
Mauser M1887
Mauser M1890
Mauser M1893
Mauser M1903, M1905 and M1908
Peabody–Martini–Henry M1874
Remington M1866 Rolling Block
Snider–Enfield Mk III
Winchester M1866Submachine gunsMP18Machine gunsBergmann MG15nA
DWM MG 08 and MG 08/15
Hotchkiss M1900
Maxim machine gun
Nordenfelt multiple barrel gun
Schwarzlose M1907/12
vickers machine gun
Lewis GunGrenadesM1915, M1916 and M1917 StielhandgranateFlamethrowersKleinflammenwerfer M1911
WechselapparatInfantry mortarGranatenwerfer 16

Portuguese RepublicSidearmsLuger P08
Mauser C96
Saint Étienne M1892
Savage M1907
Smith & Wesson No.3
Smith & Wesson M1899 Military RiflesSteyr-Kropatschek M1886
Lee–Enfield Short Magazine Mk III (Used by Portuguese forces on the Western Front)
Mauser-Verqueiro M1904
Portuguese Mannlicher M1896
M1917 EnfieldMachine gunsLewis M1917
Lewis Mk I
Vickers Mk IMortarsStokes mortar

Kingdom of RomaniaEdged weapons Model 1890
 Model 1906
 Model 1893
 Model 1909
 Model 1908SidearmsBayard M1915
Ruby M1914
Saint Étienne M1892
Smith & Wesson No.3
Steyr M1912RiflesBerthier M1907/15
Lebel M1886/93 
Mannlicher M1888/90
Mannlicher M1893
Mannlicher M1895
Mosin–Nagant M1891
Martini–Henry M1879
Vetterli-Vitali M1870/87Machine gunsChauchat M1915
Colt–Browning M1895/14
DWM MG 08
Hotchkiss M1914
Lewis Mk I
Maxim M1907 and M1909
Saint Étienne M1907
Schwarzlose M1907/12
Vickers Mk IGrenadesF1 M1915, M1916 and M1917
Savopol grenadeMortarsSaint Étienne 58mm T No.2Support gunsGruson 53 mm Model 1887/1916

Russian EmpireEdged weaponsKhanjali dagger sword (Also known as Kinzhal)
Shashka swordSidearmsBrowning FN M1903
Colt M1911
Luger P08
Mauser C96
Nagant M1895
Smith & Wesson No.3Automatic RiflesFedorov AvtomatRiflesArisaka Type 30
Arisaka Type 35
Arisaka Type 38
Berdan M1868 and M1870
Berthier M1907/15
Carl M1865
Chassepot M1866/74 
Fedorov M1916 Avtomat
Gras M1874 
Krnka M1867
Kropatschek M1878 and M1884
Lebel M1886/93 
Mosin–Nagant M1891 and M1907
Murata rifle
Martini-Henry
Remington M1910 Rolling Block
Snider-Enfield
Springfield M1892
Vetterli M1870 and M1870/87
Winchester M1873
Winchester M1876
Winchester M1886
Winchester M1892
Winchester M1895
Winchester M1907
Winchester M1910Machine gunsChauchat M1915
Colt–Browning M1895/14
Hotchkiss M1909
Lewis Mk I and M1917
Madsen M1902
Maxim M1905
Maxim M1910
Vickers Mk IGrenadesRdultovsky M1912 lantern grenade
Rdultovsky M1914 and M1917FlamethrowersTovarnitski portable flamethrowerMortarsAasen 88.9mm M1915
GR 90mm M1915Support gunsRosenberg 37mm M1915

Sublime State of PersiaSidearmsMauser C96
Modèle 1892 revolver
Gasser M1870/74
Smith & Wesson No.3RiflesBerdan M1870
Iranian Mauser M1900
Peabody–Martini–Henry M1874Machine gunsGatling gun
Lewis gun
Maxim M1904 and M1907
Vickers machine gun

Kingdom of SerbiaSidearmsChamelot–Delvigne M1873, M1874 and M1876
Gasser M1870/74
Luger P08
Mauser C96
Zastava M1871
Zastava M1891
Ruby M1914RiflesBerdan M1868 and M1870
Berthier M1892, M1892/16 and M1907/15
Gras M1874
Lebel M1886/93
Zastava M1870
Zastava M1880
Zastava M1899
Zastava M1910
Mosin–Nagant M1891Machine gunsChauchat M1915
DWM MG 08
Hotchkiss M1914
Lewis Mk I
Zastava M1905
PM M1910
Schwarzlose M1907/12GrenadesVasić M1912FlamethrowersSchilt portable flamethrowerMortarsSaint Étienne 58mm T No.2

United States of AmericaEdged weaponsBolo knife
M1905 bayonet
M1917 bayonet
M1917 and M1918 trench knifeSidearmsColt M1873 Single Action Army
Colt M1889
Colt M1892
Colt M1900
Colt M1903 Pocket Hammerless
Colt M1905 Marine Corps
Colt M1909 New Service
Colt M1911
Colt M1917
Savage M1907
Smith & Wesson M1899
Smith & Wesson M1917ShotgunsBrowning Auto-5
Remington M1910-A
Winchester M1897
Winchester M1912RiflesBerthier M1907/15
Browning M1918
Enfield M1917
Krag–Jørgensen
Lee–Enfield Short Magazine Mk III
Lee M1895 Navy
Springfield M1873 (Issued to second line troops)
Springfield M1896 and M1898
Springfield M1903
Winchester M1886
Winchester M1892
Winchester M1894
Winchester M1895
Winchester M1907
Winchester M1910Machine gunsBenét–Mercié M1909
Browning M1917
Chauchat M1915 and M1918
Colt–Browning M1895/14, Marlin Rockwell M1917 and M1918
Colt–Vickers M1915
Gatling gun
Hotchkiss M1914
Lewis M1917
M1918 Browning Automatic RifleGrenadesF1 M1916
Mk 1 grenade
Mk 2 grenade
Mk 3 grenade
No.5, No.23 and No.36 (Also known as "Mills")
Viven-Bessières M1916 rifle grenadeMortarsLivens Projector
Newton 6-inch mortar
Saint Étienne 58mm T No.2
Stokes mortarSupport gunsPuteaux 37mm M1915

Weapons used in trench raids

Billhook
Brass knuckles
Claymore
E-tool
Fascine knife
French Nail
French raiding hammer
Hatchet
Mace
Machete
Pickaxe handle
Push dagger
Spade
Stiletto
Trench knife
Trench raiding club
Webley Mk I, Mk II and Mk III

Concepts and prototypesSidearmsPrilutsky M1914
Webley-Mars Automatic Pistol
Belt buckle pistolSubmachine gunsCei-Rigotti
Andrews M1917
Chauchat-Ribeyrolles M1918 mitraillette pistolet
Frommer M1917 Stop doppel machinen pistole (Double barrel version)
Standschütze Hellriegel M1915 machinen pistole (The Standschutze was the militia unit that was armed with it)
Schwarzlose submachine gun
Sturmpistole M1918
Thompson M1917 Persuader
Thompson M1918 Annihilator
Villar-Perosa OVP M1918 (Single barrel version)
Walther M1918 machinen pistoleRiflesBurton Automatic Rifle
Fiat-Revelli M1916 automatic carbine
Howell M1915 semi automatic rifle
Huot M1916 automatic rifle
Knotgen M1914 automatischen gewehr
Lewis M1918 automatic rifle
Ribeyrolles M1918 automatique carabine
Cei-Rigotti M1895 automatic rifle
Springfield-Pedersen M1903 Mark I semi automatic rifle
Winchester-Burton M1917 automatic rifle
Rossignol ENT automatic rifle
Thornycroft carbine 
Esser-Barrat rifle
Pattern 1913 Enfield rifleMachine gunsBerthier M1908 mitrailleuse (Air cooled version)
Berthier M1911 mitrailleuse (Water cooled version)
Caldwell M1915
Darne M1916 mitrailleuse
De Knight M1902/17
DWM Parabellum MG 13 (A combination of water cooled version and air cooled version)
Fokker-Leimberger M1916 machinen gewehr
Johnston D1918
Knotgen M1912 machinen gewehr
S.I.A. M1918
Schwarzlose M1905 machinen gewehr
Ripley machine gun Grenade launchersBlanch-Chevallier grenade launcherGuided explosive weapons'''

Aubriot Gabet Land torpedo (Cable guided explosive machine)
Dayton-Wright-Kettering Bug (Remote controlled explosive plane)
Hewitt-Sperry Automatic (Remote controlled explosive plane)
Royal Aircraft Factory Ruston Proctor AT (Remote controlled explosive plane)
Schneider Crocodile land torpedo (Two versions cable guided explosive machine)
Simms Land torpedo (Cable guided explosive machine)
Wickersham Land torpedo (Cable guided explosive machine)

References

Bibliography

 David Miller. (2003). "The illustrated directory of 20th century guns". Minneapolis, Minnesota: Zenith imprint. .
 David Nicolle. (1989). "Lawrence and the Arab revolts". Cumnor Hill, Oxford: Osprey publishing. .
 James H. Willbanks. (2004). "Machine guns: An illustrated history of their impact". Santa Barbara, California: ABC-CLIO. .
 Jeff Kinard. (2004). "Pistols: An illustrated history of their impact". Santa Barbara, California: ABC-CLIO. .
 John Walterll. (2006)."The rifle story: An illustrated history from 1756 to the present day". Norwalk, Connecticut: MBI Publishing company. .
 Robert W.D. Ball. (2011). "Mauser military rifles of the world". Iola, Wisconsin: New York City, New York: F+W Media, Inc. .
 Wayne Zwoll. (2003). "Bolt action rifles". Iola, Wisconsin: Krause publications. .

Military technology
Infantry weapons

Infantry World War I